Eric Woolfson sings The Alan Parsons Project That Never Was is an album by the progressive rock musician Eric Woolfson, co-creator with Alan Parsons of The Alan Parsons Project, as well as main songwriter and manager of the band. Released in 2009, this was Woolfson's final album before he died of cancer in December of that year. The album includes songs that remained unreleased since the Project time for various reasons; however, as Woolfson himself remarks in the booklet, Parsons' dislike for some of Woolfson's compositions would have often caused them to be excluded from a Project album in its very early stages - such as, for example, "Steal Your Heart Away", an "unashamedly commercial" song with a conventionally sentimental lyric, which Parsons, in Woolfson's words, would have absolutely detested. "Somewhere in the Audience" and "Immortal" are slightly re-arranged and re-recorded versions of two of Woolfson's demos for his 2003 musical about Edgar Allan Poe; the final versions of these songs, sung by the musical's protagonist Steve Balsamo, are featured on the album Poe: More Tales of Mystery and Imagination. "Train to Wuxi" was the original version of "Train to Freedom", which is also included (with different lyrics) in the Poe musical and features Woolfson's one and only guitar solo.

Track listing 
All songs written and composed by Eric Woolfson

 "Golden Key" - 4:12
 "Nothing Can Change My Mind" - 4:00
 "Rumour Goin' Round" - 4:39
 "Any Other Day" - 3:08
 "I Can See Round Corners" - 5:15
 "Steal Your Heart Away" - 3:20
 "Along the Road Together" - 3:21
 "Somewhere in the Audience" - 4:36
 "Train to Wuxi" - 4:19
 "Immortal" - 6:02

Personnel 
Personnel as listed on CD booklet:
 Eric Woolfson - vocals, keyboards, guitar on "Train to Wuxi"
 Richard Cottle - keyboards on "Rumour Goin' Round"
 Austin Ince - Sound engineer, programming, additional keyboards
 Ian Bairnson - guitars on "Rumour Goin' Round", "Any Other Day", "Along the Road Together" and "Somewhere in the Audience"
 David Paton - bass on "Any Other Day" and "Rumour Goin' Round"
 Stuart Elliott - drums on "Any Other Day" and "Rumour Goin' Round"
 Gavin Greenaway - Strings arrangements
 Czech Philharmonic Orchestra
 Haydn Bendall - Sound engineer

Notes
Bairnson, Elliott and Paton are all former members of The Alan Parsons Project. Their parts on "Any Other Day" and "Rumour Goin' Round" were recorded respectively in 1982 and 1985 during sessions for the band's albums Eye in the Sky and Stereotomy, as the two tracks are outtakes from those albums (the latter also features multi-instrumentalist Richard Cottle, who joined the band in 1984); Bairnson's guitars on "Along the Road Together" and "Somewhere in the Audience" were played and recorded in 2009 at his home studio in Marbella, Spain, as a personal favour to Woolfson.

References

External links 
 Official web-site of The Alan Parsons Project That Never Was
 Official web-site of Eric Woolfson
 Official web-site of Poe
 Official web-site of The Alan Parsons Project

2009 albums
Eric Woolfson albums
The Alan Parsons Project albums